Charles William Brackett (November 26, 1892 – March 9, 1969) was an American screenwriter and film producer. He collaborated with Billy Wilder on sixteen films.

Life and career 

Brackett was born in Saratoga Springs, New York, the son of Mary Emma Corliss and New York State Senator, lawyer, and banker Edgar Truman Brackett. The family's roots traced back to the arrival of Richard Brackett in the Massachusetts Bay Colony in 1629, near present-day Springfield, Massachusetts. His mother's uncle, George Henry Corliss, built the Centennial Engine that powered the 1876 Centennial Exposition in Philadelphia. A 1915 graduate of Williams College, he earned his law degree from Harvard University. He joined the Allied Expeditionary Force during World War I. He was awarded the French Medal of Honor.

He was a frequent contributor to the Saturday Evening Post, Collier's, and Vanity Fair, and a drama critic for The New Yorker. He wrote five novels: The Counsel of the Ungodly (1920), Week-End (1925), That Last Infirmity (1926), American Colony (1929), and Entirely Surrounded (1934).

Brackett was a president of the Screen Writers Guild (1938–1939) and for the Academy of Motion Picture Arts and Sciences (1949–1955). He either wrote and/or produced over forty films, including To Each His Own, Ninotchka, The Major and the Minor, The Mating Season (1951), Niagara, The King and I, Ten North Frederick, The Remarkable Mr. Pennypacker and Blue Denim.

Beginning in August 1936, Brackett worked with Billy Wilder, writing the film classics The Lost Weekend and Sunset Boulevard, both of which won Academy Awards for their respective screenplays. Brackett described their collaboration process as follows: "The thing to do was suggest an idea, have it torn apart and despised. In a few days it would be apt to turn up, slightly changed, as Wilder's idea. Once I got adjusted to that way of working, our lives were simpler."

His partnership with Wilder ended in 1950 and Brackett went to work at 20th Century-Fox as a screenwriter and producer. His script for Titanic (1953) won him another Academy Award.

He received an Honorary Oscar for Lifetime Achievement in 1958.

Charles Brackett died on March 9, 1969. His diaries covering his screenwriting and social life from 1932 to 1949 were edited by Anthony Slide into Slide's book It's the Pictures That Got Small: Charles Brackett on Billy Wilder and Hollywood's Golden Age.

Personal life 
Brackett married Elizabeth Barrows Fletcher, a descendant of Stephen Hopkins of the Mayflower, on June 2, 1919. They had two daughters, Alexandra Corliss Brackett, Mrs. Larmore (1920–1965) and Elizabeth Fletcher Brackett (1922–1997). His wife died on June 7, 1948. In 1953, Brackett married Lillian Fletcher, the sister of his first wife. They had no children.

Brackett was a Republican who voted for Alf Landon in 1936 and supported Barry Goldwater in the 1964 United States presidential election.

Works

Partial filmography 

Tomorrow's Love (1925) – based on a story Interlocutory
Risky Business (1926) – based on a story Pearls Before Cecily
Pointed Heels (1929) – based on a story 
Secrets of a Secretary (1931) – based on a story
College Scandal (1935) – writer
Without Regret (1935) – writer
The Last Outpost (1935) – writer
Rose of the Rancho (1936) – writer
Woman Trap (1936) – writer
Piccadilly Jim (1936) – writer
Live, Love and Learn (1937) – writer
Bluebeard's Eighth Wife (1938)* – writer
What a Life (1939)* – writer
Ninotchka (1939)* – writer
Arise, My Love (1940)* – writer
Hold Back the Dawn (1941)* – writer
Ball of Fire (1941)* – writer
The Major and the Minor (1942)* – writer
Five Graves to Cairo (1943)* – writer, producer
The Uninvited (1944) – producer
The Lost Weekend (1945)* – producer, writer
To Each His Own (1946) – writer, producer
The Bishop's Wife (1947) – uncredited writer
A Foreign Affair (1948)* – writer, producer
The Emperor Waltz (1948)* – writer, producer
Miss Tatlock's Millions (1948) – writer, producer
Sunset Boulevard (1950)* – writer, producer
Edge of Doom (1950) – writer (uncredited)
The Mating Season (1951) – writer, producer
The Model and the Marriage Broker (1951) – writer, producer
Niagara (1953) – writer, producer
Titanic (1953) – writer, producer
Woman's World (1954) – producer
Garden of Evil (1954) – producer
The Virgin Queen (1955) – producer
The Girl in the Red Velvet Swing (1955) – writer, producer
Teenage Rebel (1956) – writer, producer
The King and I (1956) – producer
D-Day the Sixth of June (1956) – producer
The Wayward Bus (1957) – producer
The Gift of Love (1958) – producer
Ten North Frederick (1958) – producer
The Remarkable Mr. Pennypacker (1959) – producer
Blue Denim (1959) – producer
Journey to the Center of the Earth (1959) – writer, producer
High Time (1960) – producer
State Fair (1962) – producer

("*" indicates collaboration with Wilder)

Awards and nominations

Academy Awards

References

External links 

1892 births
1969 deaths
Best Adapted Screenplay Academy Award winners
Best Original Screenplay Academy Award winners
Golden Globe Award-winning producers
Presidents of the Academy of Motion Picture Arts and Sciences
Harvard Law School alumni
American male screenwriters
People from Saratoga Springs, New York
Film producers from New York (state)
Academy Honorary Award recipients
Williams College alumni
Screenwriters from New York (state)
20th-century American male writers
20th-century American screenwriters